This was the first edition of the tournament as an ATP Challenger Tour event.

Hong Seong-chan won the title after deafeating Wu Tung-lin 6–3, 6–2 in the final.

Seeds

Draw

Finals

Top half

Bottom half

References

External links
Main draw
Qualifying draw

Matsuyama Challenger - 1